The Arctic Search and Rescue Agreement (formally the Agreement on Cooperation on Aeronautical and Maritime Search and Rescue in the Arctic) is an international treaty concluded among the member states of the Arctic Council — Canada, Denmark, Finland, Iceland, Norway, Russia, Sweden and the United States — on 12 May 2011  in Nuuk, Greenland.

The treaty coordinates international search and rescue (SAR) coverage and response in the Arctic, and establishes the area of SAR responsibility of each state party. In view of the conflicting territorial claims in the Arctic, the treaty provides that "the delimitation of search and rescue regions is not related to and shall not prejudice the delimitation of any boundary between States or their sovereignty, sovereign rights or jurisdiction."

The Arctic Search and Rescue Agreement is the first binding agreement negotiated under the auspices of the Arctic Council. The treaty reflects the Arctic region's growing economic importance as a result of its improved accessibility due to global warming.

The government of Canada is the depositary for the treaty. It entered into force on 19 January 2013 after it had been ratified by each of the eight signatory states.

See also
Arctic Council
Arctic Climate Impact Assessment (ACIA)
Arctic Environmental Protection Strategy
Arctic Cooperation and Politics
Arctic policy of Canada

References

External links
 Text of the Arctic Search and Rescue Agreement

Government of the Arctic
Treaties concluded in 2011
Rescue
Treaties entered into force in 2013
Treaties of Canada
Treaties of Denmark
Treaties of Finland
Treaties of Iceland
Treaties of Norway
Treaties of Russia
Treaties of Sweden
Treaties of the United States
2011 in Greenland
21st century in the Arctic